Sir Edward Bayly, 1st Baronet (20 February 1684 – 28 September 1741) was an Irish landowner and politician.

Background
Bayly was the son of Nicholas Bayly, son of The Right Reverend Lewis Bayly and Anne, daughter of Sir Henry Bagenal. His mother was Dorothy (née Hall).

Political career
Bayly was elected to the Irish House of Commons for Newry in 1705, a seat he held until 1714. In 1712 he inherited substantial estates in Anglesey, including Plas Newydd, and in Ireland on the death of his cousin Nicholas Bagenall. He was High Sheriff of Anglesey in 1717 and High Sheriff of Down in 1730. In 1730 he was created a Baronet, of Plas Newydd in the County of Anglesey and Mount Bagenall in the County of Down, in the Baronetage of Ireland.

Family
Bayly married Dorothy, daughter of the Hon. Oliver Lambart, in 1708. Their younger son the Very Reverend Edward Bayly became Archdeacon of Dublin. Bayly died in September 1741, aged 57, and was succeeded by his eldest son, Nicholas. The latter's son Henry succeeded as 10th Baron Paget in 1769, was created Earl of Uxbridge in 1784 and was the father of Henry Paget, 1st Marquess of Anglesey, hero of the Battle of Waterloo. Lady Bayly survived her husband by four years and died in August 1745.

References

1684 births
1741 deaths
Baronets in the Baronetage of Ireland
High Sheriffs of Down
High Sheriffs of Anglesey
Irish MPs 1703–1713
Irish MPs 1713–1714
Edward
Members of the Parliament of Ireland (pre-1801) for County Armagh constituencies